A Man's Work, also known as A Man's Job in the United States, is a 2007 Finnish drama film directed by Aleksi Salmenperä. It was Finland's submission to the 80th Academy Awards for the Academy Award for Best Foreign Language Film, but was not accepted as a nominee. It was also entered into the 29th Moscow International Film Festival.

Cast
 Tommi Korpela as Juha
 Maria Heiskanen as Katja
 Jani Volanen as Olli
 Stan Saanila as Jamppa
 Konsta Pylkkönen as Akseli
 Noora Dadu as Nuori nainen 1
 Joanna Haartti as Nuori nainen 2
 Kaarina Hazard as Asiakas / lääkäri 1
 Vilma Juutilainen as Oona
 Helmi Kaartinen as Ida
 Arttu Kapulainen as Nuori taksikuski
 Leea Klemola as Katrin assistantti

See also
Cinema of Finland
List of submissions to the 80th Academy Awards for Best Foreign Language Film

References

External links

2007 films
2007 drama films
Finnish drama films
2000s Finnish-language films